Hill Grove is an unincorporated community in Darke County, in the U.S. state of Ohio.

History
Hill Grove was laid out in 1848. A post office called Hill Grove was established in 1837, and remained in operation until 1917. Being close to Union City limited the community's early growth.

Notable person
Harvey C. Garber, U.S. Representative from Ohio

References

Unincorporated communities in Darke County, Ohio
Unincorporated communities in Ohio